Passion is the ninth studio album by English neo-progressive rock group Pendragon. It was released as a special edition on 11 April 2011 on Madfish, a division label of Snapper Music and in regular form through Toff Records, the band's own imprint. Two packaging formats of the Madfish album exist, digi-book and super jewel case both accompanied by a DVD featuring a behind-the-scenes footage titled 'Progumentary', filmed by the band themselves during the recording of the album. There is also a two-disc, three sided orange coloured vinyl edition with gatefold sleeve.

Reception

The global impression of the album was generally positive, with a 4.04 out of 5 stars score in Prog Archives, across 123 given ratings as for May 22, 2011. Dangerdog website gave it a 4 out of 5 score, describing it as "intriguing, complicated, and entertaining" and remarking "those who were persuaded by Pendragon's talent and creativity on Pure will likely be pleased with Passion; it's more of the same, but not". Sea of Tranquility advises "in comparison to the light-hearted, feel-good symphonic prog of their albums from the early 1990s, this may feel like a radical departure for some", giving it 3.5 out of 5 stars. A more enthusiastic Rock Report states that "because of the diversity and continuous change of atmospheres, it’s hard to point out the highlights" and "maybe it means that the whole album is a highlight".

Track listing

CD+DVD edition
CD

DVD
 "Progumentary"

Vinyl edition

Side 1
 "Passion"
 "Empathy"

Side 2
 "Feeding Frenzy"
 "This Green And Pleasant Land"

Side 3
 "It's Just A Matter Of Not Getting Caught"
 "Skara Brae"
 "Your Black Heart "

Personnel
 Nick Barrett: guitars, lead vocals, keyboards, programming
 Clive Nolan: keyboards, backing vocals
 Peter Gee: bass
 Scott Higham: drums, backing vocals

Charts

References

External links
Pendragon's official website
Passion mini-site
Passion review on Prog Sphere

2011 albums
Pendragon (band) albums
Snapper Music albums